The Stanley M. Rowe Arboretum is a public arboretum covering  in Indian Hill, Ohio. It is owned by the Indian Hill city government and operated by a non-profit organization.

The arboretum was founded in 1926 by Stanley M. Rowe, Sr. and his wife Dorothy Snowden Rowe. Their first trees were Northern Red Oaks, European Larch, Eastern White Pine, and Scots Pine. The Rowe property eventually expanded to  containing some 1,800 different species of trees and shrubs, with a focus on conifers. As most of the finest trees were in one area, it was given to the village as a parkland.

The American Horticultural Society, honoring Rowe in 1982 with an amateur citation for the arboretum, commended its "remarkable collection of conifers, crabapples, magnolias, oaks and beeches". It has been designated as a Conifer Reference Garden by the American Conifer Society.

External links

Official website
"Outstanding Conifers", The American Gardner, American Horticultural Society
Stanley M. Rowe biography, University of Cincinnati
Gardens across America: the American Horticultural Society's Guide to American Public Gardens and Arboreta, Vol. 2. Lanham: Taylor Trade Pub., 2005.

See also
 List of botanical gardens in the United States

Arboreta in Ohio
Rowe Arboretum
Indian Hill, Ohio
Protected areas of Hamilton County, Ohio
Nature centers in Ohio